Shelia R. Stubbs (born February 22, 1971) is an American politician, pastor, and former probation and parole agent. She is a Democratic member of the Wisconsin State Assembly, elected in 2018, representing the south and west parts of Madison, Wisconsin.  She is also a member of the Dane County Board of Supervisors, since 2006; she is the only African American on the County Board and is Dane County's first African American representative in the Wisconsin Legislature.

Background 
Stubbs was born in Camden, Arkansas, but moved to Beloit, Wisconsin, as a child (Walter Knight, her uncle, served on Beloit's city council and its police and fire commission).  She graduated from Beloit Memorial High School and attended Tougaloo College, earning a baccalaureate degree in political science. She went on to study at Mount Senario College, earning a second baccalaureate, in criminal justice management, and then earned a master's in management at Milwaukee's Cardinal Stritch University. She had worked for eight years as a probation and parole agent with the Wisconsin Department of Corrections before first being elected to the Dane County Board in 2006. She and her husband, Godfrey Stubbs, have one daughter. The Stubbs' are co-founders of End Time Ministries International Church in Madison. Her mother, Linda Hoskins, is a former president of the Madison chapter of the NAACP.

2018 race 
Democratic incumbent Terese Berceau announced on February 2, 2018, that she would not be running for re-election from the 77th Assembly district, and Stubbs announced her own candidacy the same day. With the Democratic nomination tantamount to winning in this heavily-Democratic district, she acquired three opponents (and Berceau's endorsement). In the primary election, she achieved a plurality of fractionally under 50% of the votes, with 7,758 to Shabnam Lotfi's 5,611 (36%), John Imes' 1,222 (8%) and Mark Garthwaite's 968 (6%). Unopposed in the general election for the 2019–2020 Assembly term, Stubbs became the first African-American woman to represent a Dane County district in the legislature, and was the only African-American woman in the Assembly.

Police call 
Stubbs's campaign attracted national news coverage when during her canvassing in a predominantly-white neighborhood, a call was made to the Madison Police Department reporting her and her family (she was with her daughter and mother) as "They are waiting for drugs at the local drug house — would like them moved along." (She did not announce the incident until after the primary.) An anonymous letter purporting to be from the person who made the call, and emphasizing "but I never called the police on you, on a woman of color in the neighborhood... I called on a car, not you" has been received by a local television station.

Electoral history

| colspan="6" style="text-align:center;background-color: #e9e9e9;"| Democratic Primary Election, August 18, 2018

| colspan="6" style="text-align:center;background-color: #e9e9e9;"| General Election, November 6, 2018

References

External links 
 Representative Shelia Stubbs at Wisconsin Legislature
 Campaign website
 End Time Ministries International
 
 

1971 births
Living people
Probation and parole officers
People from Camden, Arkansas
Politicians from Beloit, Wisconsin
Politicians from Madison, Wisconsin
Cardinal Stritch University alumni
Tougaloo College alumni
Mount Senario College alumni
Democratic Party members of the Wisconsin State Assembly
African-American state legislators in Wisconsin
Women state legislators in Wisconsin
African-American women in politics
21st-century American politicians
21st-century American women politicians
2020 United States presidential electors
21st-century African-American women
21st-century African-American politicians
20th-century African-American people
20th-century African-American women